Isaac L. Chuang is an American electrical engineer and physicist. He leads the quanta research group at the Center for Ultracold Atoms at Massachusetts Institute of Technology (MIT). He received his undergraduate degrees in physics (1990) and electrical engineering (1991) and master's in electrical engineering (1991) at MIT.  In 1997 he received his PhD in electrical engineering from Stanford University.

Chuang is one of the pioneers of NMR quantum computing. Since 2003, Chuang has focused his attention on trapped ion approaches to quantum computing, as the field of liquid state NMR quantum computing fell out of favor due to limitations on its scalability beyond tens of qubits due to noise.

Chuang is also widely known for having authored Quantum Computation and Quantum Information, one of the primary reference books in the field with Michael Nielsen, cited by more than 40,000.

While employed at IBM in 1999, Chuang was to be featured in a film by Errol Morris, commissioned by IBM for an internal conference on the occasion of the year 2000.  The conference was cancelled and the film was never completed, however excerpts including Chuang can be viewed at Morris's personal web site.

In 2015, he led a study showing that some students on the edX platform cheat by creating multiple accounts and "harvesting" correct answers.

Honors
 2010 Fellow of the American Physical Society
 In 1999, he was named to the MIT Technology Review TR100 as one of the top 100 innovators in the world under the age of 35.

Selected bibliography

References 

Living people
21st-century American physicists
American electrical engineers
Fellows of the American Physical Society
Quantum information scientists
Year of birth missing (living people)
MIT Department of Physics alumni
American people of Chinese descent